West Lake is a small community in Prince Edward County, Ontario.  It is situated on the south shore of a bay of Lake Ontario which is known as West Lake.

Communities in Prince Edward County, Ontario